The 2020 GT World Challenge Europe Powered by AWS was the seventh season of the GT World Challenge Europe and the first after title sponsor Blancpain withdrew sponsorship. The season began on 25 July at Imola and ended on 15 November at Circuit Paul Ricard.

This season featured eight rounds: four Endurance Cup rounds and four Sprint Cup rounds.

Calendar
The provisional calendar was released on 26 July 2019.

Race results
Bold indicates overall winner.

Championship standings
Scoring system
Championship points are awarded for the first ten positions in each race. The pole-sitter also receives one point and entries are required to complete 75% of the winning car's race distance in order to be classified and earn points. Individual drivers are required to participate for a minimum of 25 minutes in order to earn championship points in any race.

Sprint Cup points

Imola points

Nürburgring & Paul Ricard points

24 Hours of Spa points
Points are awarded after six hours, after twelve hours and at the finish.

Drivers' championships

Overall

Silver Cup

Pro-Am Cup

Team's championships

Overall

Silver Cup

Pro-Am Cup

See also
2020 GT World Challenge Europe Endurance Cup
2020 GT World Challenge Europe Sprint Cup
2020 GT World Challenge America
2020 GT World Challenge Asia

References

External links

2020 GT World Challenge Europe
GT World Challenge Europe
GT World